Albertine is the only novel of writer and critic Jacqueline Rose. It is a parallel novel, using characters and events from Marcel Proust's 1913–1927 seven-volume novel In Search of Lost Time.

Plot summary
The beautiful orphan Albertine comes into contact with the austere young Marcel at a Normandy seaside hotel, whilst on holiday with friends. She soon becomes embroiled in a destructive affair with the young man, trapping them both in his Paris apartment. His jealousy and her strong will, and bisexual attraction to others, cause both unhappiness. A gynocentric revisiting of Proust, it is a feminist re-imagining, giving Albertine a voice she has been denied in Proust's books.

External links
TempsPerdu.com A site about 'In Search of Lost Time'
Guardian review
Observer review
Jacqueline Rose QMUL Staff Page

2001 British novels
Parallel literature
Feminist novels
Works about Marcel Proust
Cultural depictions of Marcel Proust
Chatto & Windus books
British LGBT novels
2000s LGBT novels
2001 LGBT-related literary works